Nikolaus (Klaus) Müller (April 19, 1892, Augsburg – August 6, 1980, ibid.) was the mayor of Augsburg, Germany, between 1947 and 1964. He was a member of the Christian Social Union of Bavaria.

Mayors of Augsburg
1892 births
1980 deaths
Commanders Crosses of the Order of Merit of the Federal Republic of Germany